Ženski košarkaški klub Mladi Krajišnik is a women's professional basketball club based in Banja Luka, Bosnia and Herzegovina. The club is founded in 1963. The club currently plays in Women's Bosnian League.

History
ŽKK Mladi Krajišnik was founded in the 25 May 1963. After just a year of operation in 1964, "Mladi Krajisnik" Banja Luka qualified for the First Federal League at the qualifying tournament in Banja Luka, which was attended by Rudar Trbovlje, Skopje Skopje, Voždovac Belgrade, Mladi Krajišnik Banja Luka, such as Little ones (as it was then popularly called) made his big wish and dream.

From 1964 to 1972 the Little ones are three times fell out and entered the First Federal League, in 1972 the qualifier Little ones they won Partizan Belgrade and the third time become members of the First Federal League. From 1972 until 1995, Little ones are continuously for 23 years a member of the First Federal League and the Red Star Belgrade has the longest continuity of membership in the First Federal League.

War of 1995 Little ones after 23 years of playing got out of the First Federal League to First female B league Yugoslavia where playing for 2 years. 1997 Little ones are after 2 years again placed First Women's Basketball league of Yugoslavia at the qualifying tournament in Ruma were: Trudbenik Beograd, Čelarevo, Budućnost Podgorica and Mladi Krajišnik

Arena

Current roster

Semsa Suljakovic
Mirzeta Kararic

Honours

Notable former players
Marina Marković
Saša Čađo
Biljana Pavićević
Ivona Bogoje
Anđelija Arbutina - Šarenac
Jadranka Ćosić - Trkulja
Lara Mandić 
Milica Deura
Ivona Jerković
Ana Joković
Mersada Bećirspahić
Slađana Golić
 Sanda Vuković

Notable former coaches

External links
 
 Profile on eurobasket.com
 Profile on srbijasport.net

Mladi Krajisnik
Sport in Banja Luka
Women's basketball teams in Yugoslavia
Basketball teams established in 1963